The Hazelaarweg Stadion is a multi-use stadium in Rotterdam, Netherlands, run by the biggest field hockey club in the Netherlands, HC Rotterdam. It is close to the international cricket ground occupied by VOC Rotterdam.

Other sports
It is currently used mostly for field hockey matches and hosted matches for the 2001 Men's Champions Trophy.  The stadium holds 3,500 people and was built in 2000.

List of Five Wicket Hauls

One Day Internationals

References

HC Rotterdam
Sports venues in Rotterdam
Field hockey venues in the Netherlands
Cricket grounds in the Netherlands